Charles Krause may refer to:

Charles I. Krause (1911–2002), American labor union organizer and local executive
Charles Krause (gymnast), American gymnast

See also
Charles Kraus (disambiguation)